Ramadhani may refer to the following people
Given name
Ramadhani Athumani Maneno, Tanzanian politician 

Surname
John Ramadhani (born 1932), Tanzanian Anglican archbishop
Nabeel Siddiq al-Ramadhani (born 1954), British businessman
Nia Ramadhani (born 1990), Indonesian actress, singer, rapper, and dancer
Samson Ramadhani (born 1982), Tanzanian marathon runner
Sara Ramadhani (born 1987), Tanzanian long-distance runner 
Waso Ramadhani (born 1984), Burundian football defender

See also
Ramadani